Glenn Garrison (born March 25, 1974) is an American wrestler who won a bronze medal in the 66 kg Greco-Roman event at the 2011 Pan American Games. He was also third at the 2004 World Cup.

Glenn Garrison, aka Gare-Bear, is currently commanding the "Lawn Chair". He also Has a Nephew named River Garrison and a niece named Georgia Garrison

References

1974 births
Living people
American male sport wrestlers
Pan American Games bronze medalists for the United States
Pan American Games medalists in wrestling
Wrestlers at the 2011 Pan American Games
Medalists at the 2011 Pan American Games
20th-century American people
21st-century American people